Paul Joseph D. Conlin (born January 26, 1943) is a Canadian ice hockey player who played for the St. Michael's Majors and Canadian national team. He scored the game-winning goal in the 1961 Memorial Cup for the St. Mike's Majors. He played for Canada in the 1964 and 1968 Olympics and won a bronze medal at the 1968 Winter Olympics. He is a lawyer practising in Ottawa, Ontario. In 2012 he was inducted into the Lucan Hall of Fame.

References

External links
 

1943 births
Living people
Canadian ice hockey players
Ice hockey players at the 1964 Winter Olympics
Ice hockey players at the 1968 Winter Olympics
Medalists at the 1968 Winter Olympics
Olympic ice hockey players of Canada
Olympic medalists in ice hockey
Olympic bronze medalists for Canada
People from Middlesex County, Ontario